Agrilus sapindi, the native soapberry borer, is a species of metallic wood-boring beetle in the family Buprestidae. It is found in North America.

References

Further reading

 
 
 

sapindi
Articles created by Qbugbot
Beetles described in 1938